Nadaniyaan was a Hindi sitcom presented by BIG Magic and produced by Dheeraj Kumar and later produced by Sagar Pictures. An adaption of the Pakistani sitcom Nadaaniyaan, it stars Iqbal Azad, Gunn Kansara, Gaurav Sharma, Baldev Trehan, Samiksha Bhatt, Upasana Singh, Alok Nath, Jay Pathak,  and Neelam Sivia.

Plot
The story is about a family of four that lives in New Delhi.

Seasons
The series had three seasons.
Season 1 – Nadaniyaan (2013)
Season 2 – Uff! Yeh Nadaniyaan! (2014)
Season 3 – Phir Yeh Nadaniyaan! (2014)
Season 4 – Total Nadaniyaan! (2015)

Cast

Iqbal Azad / Jay Pathak as Naman "Nandu" Verma: Nandu is a television writer and a full-time house husband who loves his wife Chandni and his younger brother Pushkar. Nandu is lazy and often mocked by his wife about his unemployment.
Gunn Kansara / Neetha Shetty / Samiksha Bhatt as Chandani Verma "Chandu": Chandu is the matriarch of  the Verma family and has a clerical job. She  usually scolds Nandu & Pappu due to their lazy attitudes towards life.
Gaurav Sharma as Pushkar "Pappu" Verma /Chota Don: The youngest member of Verma family who loves to flirt with girls wearing fake designer clothes in order display to others his sister-in-law's wealth.
Baldev Trehan / Nithyanandam Ramachandra as Bhagwan Uncle :A troublesome neighbor who is always seen wandering on Nandu's lawn.He has two wives and claims to have 7 fathers. Having a chat with him is like intentionally going wanting to kill oneself - as felt by Pappu. Like Pappu, he likes to flirt with girls much younger than himself.
Upasana Singh as Taravanti Verma: Nandu and Pappu's mother.
Alok Nath as "Babuji", the deceased father of Nandu and Pappu, Alok Nath, portrayed as a "Sanskaari Bebuji" whose photo is  prominently displayed  on one of  the drawing room walls and his portrait is often referred to by Pappu to emotionally blackmail his brother Nandu. This comic punch is used in the wake of Alok Nath's jokes that showed Nath as a "Sanskaari Babuji". Babuji currently accompanies them in a comic role.
Garima Tiwari as Taniya : Chandu's friend and Pappu 's love interest.
Abhishek Verma as Jasveer "Jassi" Singh, Jassi's brother
Shalini Sahuta as Jasmeet "Jassi" Verma, Pappu's Wife
Raja Jung Bahadur as Raja Jung Bahadur, Watchman
 Gajendra Chauhan as Mr. Chaddha, Secretary of society where Verma's live.

References

External links

Indian television sitcoms
Indian comedy television series
Big Magic original programming
Off-color humor
2010s black comedy television series
2010s satirical television series
Indian satire
Indian television series based on non-Indian television series
2013 Indian television series debuts
2017 Indian television series endings